The Greater Toronto Area (GTA) contains ten airports, eight heliports, and one water aerodrome. These aviation facilities are situated within and around Toronto and its neighbouring cities, serving airline passengers, regional air travel and commercial cargo transportation. Toronto Pearson International Airport, located mainly in Mississauga, is the busiest airport in Canada and hosts international travel with various airlines. Billy Bishop Toronto City Airport on the Toronto Islands is a regional airport, providing regular services to United States destinations. John C. Munro Hamilton International Airport in Hamilton is a base for low-cost carriers that fly domestic and transatlantic routes. Pearson, Bishop, and Hamilton combined served over 53 million passengers in 2018, making Toronto the world's 31st busiest city airport system in the world.

Heliports and water aerodromes are mostly for private use only, mainly by institutions and medical services.

Airports

Scheduled commercial airline service

Other

Water aerodromes

Heliports

Other airports

Proposed airports 
There is a proposal to develop a new Pickering Airport northeast of the city, to complement Pearson. Versions of these tentative plans have been in existence since the early 1970s, and land for this proposed airport was expropriated by government authorities in 1972. However, continued and vociferous local opposition to the Pickering airport scheme has meant that forty years later, the airport had not moved beyond the discussion phase. In June 2013, the federal government announced the revival of the airport, but development is not expected to take place until 2027 to 2037.

Historical airports
The following airports once served the area but have since been closed:

See also

 List of airports in the Bala, Ontario area
 List of airports in the Bracebridge area
 List of airports in the Fergus area
 List of airports in the London, Ontario area
 List of airports in the Ottawa area
 List of airports in the Parry Sound area
 List of airports in the Port Carling area
 List of airports in the Sault Ste. Marie, Ontario area
 List of airports in the Thunder Bay area
 List of cities with more than one commercial airport
 YTO, IATA airline code for Toronto location

References

External links
 Toronto Historic Airfields

 
Toronto
Toronto
Toronto
Airports
Airports